Oluwafemi "Femi" Javier Azeez (born 5 June 2001) is an English professional footballer who plays as a winger and striker for Reading.

Career
After playing for Northwood under-18's during the 2017–18 season, he made his senior debut for the club towards the end of the season and made 12 appearances for the club in total. He joined Wealdstone in summer 2018, before signing for Hanwell Town on dual registration in December 2018.
On 18 September 2019, Reading announced the signing of Azeez to their academy. On 8 February 2020, Azeez joined Bracknell Town on an initial 28-day loan deal. On 2 July 2020, Reading announced that Azeez had signed a new one-year contract with the club. A year later, 2 July 2021, Reading announced that Azeez had signed another one-year contract with the club.

He scored his first goal for Reading, and his first professional goal, in a 2-1 win against Preston North End on 14 August 2021.

Personal life
Azeez was born in England to a Nigerian father and Spanish mother. Azeez's brother, Miguel Azeez, is also a professional footballer at the youth academy of Arsenal.

Career statistics

References

External links
 

2001 births
Living people
English footballers
English sportspeople of Nigerian descent
English people of Spanish descent
Association football midfielders
Wealdstone F.C. players
Reading F.C. players
Bracknell Town F.C. players